Direct action is militant political action outside the usual political channels.

Direct action may also refer to:

Books
 Direct Action: An Ethnography, a 2009 book by David Graeber
 Direct Action: Memoirs of an Urban Guerrilla, a book about anarchism by Ann Hansen

Organizations
 Action Directe (English: Direct Action), a French leftist terrorist group
 Direct Action (trade union), an independent Ukrainian students union
 Direct Action, also known as the Squamish Five, a Canadian anarchist organization

Periodicals
 Direct Action (magazine), an anarchist magazine published by the Solidarity Federation
 Direct Action (newspaper), an Australian newspaper published in Sydney, New South Wales

Other uses
 Act of War: Direct Action, a 2005 real-time strategy game
 Action Directe (climb), a rock climb in Frankenjura, Germany
 Direct action (military), a military operation involving special operations forces
 Direct Action: Day 21, a 2001 album by punk rock band Sham 69
 Direct Action Day (16 August 1946), a day of rioting and killing in Calcutta also known as the Great Calcutta Killings
 Direct-action lawsuit (legal)